The Seattle Children's Museum in Seattle is located on the lowest floor of the Armory at the Seattle Center.  Founded in 1979 with a single exhibit, the museum currently features 18,000 sq feet of play space with 11 exhibits designed for kids 6 months to 8 years. Visitors to the main floor of the Center House can look down into a large open space in the floor which is part of the museum; this was once the site of the bubbleator.

See also
 Children's museum

References

External links

Seattle Children's Museum

Museums in Seattle
Children's museums in Washington (state)
Seattle Center